The Tehachapi Loop is a  spiral, or helix, on the Union Pacific Railroad Mojave Subdivision through Tehachapi Pass, of the Tehachapi Mountains in Kern County, south-central California. The line connects Bakersfield and the San Joaquin Valley to Mojave in the Mojave Desert.

Rising at a steady two-percent grade, the track gains  in elevation and makes a  circle. Any train that is at least , or approximately 56 box cars, long passes over itself going around the loop. At the bottom of the loop, the track passes through Tunnel 9, the ninth tunnel built as the railroad was extended from Bakersfield.

The line averages about 36 freight trains each day; passenger services such as Amtrak's San Joaquin are banned from using the loop, while the Coast Starlight can only use it as a detour. Its frequent trains and scenic setting make the Tehachapi Loop popular with railfans. In 1998, it was named a National Historic Civil Engineering Landmark. It is also designated as California Historical Landmark #508.

History
One of the engineering feats of its day, the Loop was built by Southern Pacific Railroad to ease the grade over Tehachapi Pass. Construction began in 1874, and the line opened in 1876. Contributors to the project's construction include Arthur De Wint Foote and the project's chief engineer, William Hood.

The siding on the loop is known as Walong after Southern Pacific District Roadmaster W. A. Long.

The project was constructed under the leadership of Southern Pacific's civil engineers, James R. Strobridge and William Hood, using a predominantly Chinese labor force. The Tehachapi line necessitated 18 tunnels, 10 bridges, and numerous water towers to replenish steam locomotives. In 1882, the line was extended through Southern California and the Mojave Desert with 8,000 Chinese men working under Strobridge and another man.

A large white cross, "The Cross at the Loop", stands atop the hill in the center of the loop in memory of two Southern Pacific Railroad employees killed on May 12, 1989, in a train derailment in San Bernardino, California.

The Tehachapi Depot Museum is located in the nearby town of Tehachapi.

Operations
The Loop became the property of the Union Pacific Railroad in 1996, when the Union Pacific and Southern Pacific systems merged. Trains of the BNSF Railway also use the loop under trackage rights.

Although Southern Pacific ran passenger trains on the Loop for years, it banned passenger service there soon after handing its trains to Amtrak in 1971. Union Pacific has maintained the ban since taking over Southern Pacific. As a result, Amtrak's San Joaquin train is unable to directly serve Los Angeles until a bypass is constructed or the federal government of the United States or the California State Legislature compel the railroad to allow passenger service to resume. Amtrak operates Thruway Motorcoach buses for passengers wanting to travel between the Central Valley and Los Angeles.

An exception is made for the Coast Starlight, which uses the line as a detour if its normal route is closed.

California Historical Landmark
The California Historical Landmark plaque reads:

NO. 508 TEHACHAPI LOOP - From this spot may be seen a portion of the world-renowned Loop completed in 1876 under the direction of William Hood, Southern Pacific railroad engineer. In gaining elevation around the central hill of the Loop, a 4,000-foot train will cross 77 feet above its rear cars in the tunnel below.

The markers at the overlook were rearranged when a viewing platform was constructed at the scenic overlook on Woodford-Tehachapi Road in the summer of 2021. The cement platform was built so that railroad enthusiasts can view trains on the loop while keeping a safe distance from the winding, two-lane roadway.

See also

Williams Loop — another loop in California
 California Historical Landmarks in Kern County
California Historical Landmark

References

External links

  New aerial video of the 2nd track improvement, Nov 2016
  Aerial video of 4000' train going uphill through the loop Nov 2015
 Trainweb.org: Tehachapi Loop - Map and Railfan Info
 Tehachapi Loop - A Brief History
 Tehachapi Loop Photos
 Photo Gallery of Tehachapi Loop shots
 HO Scale Model at the San Diego Model Railroad Museum
 Stay In The Loop - Tehachapi News & Entertainment
 Aerial video of BNSF train traversing Tehachapi Loop
 A photographic report of Tehachapi and Cajon Pass (May, 2012) 

Rail infrastructure in California
Southern Pacific Railroad
Atchison, Topeka and Santa Fe Railway
Transportation buildings and structures in Kern County, California
California Historical Landmarks
Historic Civil Engineering Landmarks
Transport infrastructure completed in 1876
Tourist attractions in Kern County, California
Tehachapi Mountains
1876 establishments in California
Union Pacific Railroad lines